Amblyptilia grisea is a moth of the family Pterophoridae that is found in Central Asia (Russia and Kazakhstan).

References

Moths described in 1997
Amblyptilia